The United States Postal Service Office of Inspector General (OIG) was created by Public Law 104–208, passed by Congress in 1996. The inspector general of the United States Postal Service (USPS) is appointed by the presidentially appointed governors on the Board of Governors of the United States Postal Service and reports to them. The term of the inspector general is a maximum of seven years. To ensure accountability, the inspector general keeps Congress, the governors, and Postal Service management informed of the office's work and alerted to potential areas where the Postal Service could be more economical and efficient.

The OIG achieves its mission of helping maintain confidence in the postal system and improving the Postal Service's bottom line through independent audits and investigations. Audits of postal programs and operations help to determine whether the programs and operations are efficient and cost-effective. Investigations help prevent and detect fraud, waste, and misconduct and have a deterrent effect on postal crimes.

The United States Postal Inspection Service is a separate agency.

History 
 The current USPS inspector general is Tammy L. Whitcomb, who was appointed by the governors of the Board of Governors of the United States Postal Service on November 29, 2018. She is the USPS's third inspector general, who served as Deputy Inspector General from November 2011 and was acting Inspector General from February 2016 until her appointment.
 The USPS's second inspector general was David C. Williams, who was inspector general from August 20, 2003, until he resigned on February 19, 2016. In June 2013, Williams criticized the Postal Service's real estate contract with CBRE, a multinational real estate company, citing "conflict of interest concerns." Williams was nominated in October 2017 by President Donald Trump for a position of governor on the USPS Board of Governors.
 The first USPS inspector general was Karla W. Corcoran, who held the position from January 1997, after the position was created in 1996. She resigned on August 19, 2003, after a federal investigation found that she abused her authority, wasted public money and promoted questionable personnel practices.

List of United States Postal Service inspectors general

See also 
 United States Postal Inspection Service
 Office of Inspector General (United States)

References

External links 

1996 establishments in the United States
Postal Service Office of Inspector General
United States Postal Service